Abubakar Mahadi (born 29 November 1993 in Accra) is a Ghanaian football striker.

Career 
Mahadi began his career by Feyenoord Academy, joined than to Académie de Sol Beni. Promoted to the first team in 2008 and will hope to see game time in his first MTN CAF Champions League campaign, in September 2008 moved back to Feyenoord Academy. He joined in summer 2010 to Medeama SC F.C., which loaned him on 24. September 2010 to Kaduna United F.C. of Nigeria. Despite all the attempts made by Kaduna FC for the outright signature of the young Ghanaian striker has proven unsuccessful. In summer 2011 Aboubakar Mahadi signed for Wassaman United and scored his first goal for his new club on 30 July 2011 against Tarkwa United.

He moved to Saudi club Afeef in 2018.

References 

1993 births
Living people
Ghanaian footballers
Expatriate footballers in Ivory Coast
ASEC Mimosas players
Ghanaian expatriate sportspeople in Ivory Coast
West African Football Academy players
Footballers from Accra
Medeama SC players
Ghanaian expatriate sportspeople in Nigeria
Kaduna United F.C. players
Expatriate footballers in Nigeria
Ghanaian expatriate footballers
Association football forwards
Emmanuel Stars F.C. players
Asante Kotoko S.C. players
El Entag El Harby SC players
FC Mauerwerk players
Afif FC players
Ghanaian expatriate sportspeople in Austria
Expatriate footballers in Austria
Ghanaian expatriate sportspeople in Egypt
Expatriate footballers in Egypt
Ghanaian expatriate sportspeople in Saudi Arabia
Expatriate footballers in Saudi Arabia
Egyptian Premier League players
Saudi Second Division players